Alexander Lindström (born November 4, 1989 in Lit, Sweden) is a Swedish-Norwegian curler, from Oslo.

Curling career

Juniors
Lindström twice represented Sweden at the World Junior Curling Championships. His first World Juniors was in 2009, throwing second stones for Oskar Eriksson. After posting a 6-3 round robin record, the team would lose in the 3 vs. 4 game and in the bronze medal final, settling for fourth place. Lindström returned to the World Juniors in 2011, playing lead for Eriksson, on a team which included his brother Kristian throwing last rocks. The team would finish the round robin in first place with an 11–1 record. The team then beat Switzerland twice in the playoffs to claim the gold medal.

Men's
Lindström would move to Norway and would join the Steffen Walstad team at lead. They would qualify for the 2017 World Men's Curling Championship where they would finish in 8th place with a 5–6 record.

Personal life
Lindström works as a security guard. His twin brother Kristian skips his own team in Sweden and formerly played for Niklas Edin rink.

References

External links
 

Living people
1989 births
Swedish male curlers
Swedish curling champions
Norwegian male curlers
Sportspeople from Oslo
Sportspeople from Trondheim
People from Östersund
Swedish emigrants to Norway
Twin sportspeople
Swedish twins
Norwegian twins
Norwegian curling coaches